Oswaldo de Oliveira Filho (born 5 December 1950), known as Oswaldo de Oliveira, is a Brazilian football manager.

Manager career
Born in Rio de Janeiro, Oswaldo de Oliveira became the first team coach for Corinthians in 1999 when Vanderlei Luxemburgo left the club to take the Brazil National Team manager role. Oliveira led the club to win the São Paulo State Championship and the Brazilian Série A that same year. In 2000, he made history by taking the first FIFA Club World Championship.

After leaving Corinthians, Oliveira would coach Brazilian teams Vasco, Fluminense, São Paulo, Flamengo, Vitória, Santos, Fluminense and Cruzeiro. The only title at this period would come with São Paulo, the 2002 São Paulo State Super Championship. After tricolor lost in Campeonato Brasileiro de 2002 against Santos, and lost the final of Campeonato Paulista de 2003 for Corinthians, Oliveira was dismissed because of bad results. He also had a short spell at Al-Ahli of Qatar.

In 2007 Oliveira started to coach J. League side Kashima Antlers. So far he has had a quite successful managerial career in Japan, winning three J. League Division 1 titles, one Emperor's Cup, one Japanese Super Cup. In 2009, he became the first J. League manager to be named J. League Manager of the Year three times. In 2012, Oliveira returned to managing in Brazil when he became the manager of Rio de Janeiro side Botafogo. In the 2013 season, he led Botafogo to 4th place in the league, qualifying the team for the Copa Libertadores. After the 2013 season, Oliveira was hired by fellow Brazilian side Santos FC. In 2015, he coached Palmeiras, which made him the first manager to have worked with all four main teams of São Paulo (Corinthians, Palmeiras, Santos and São Paulo) and four main teams of Rio de Janeiro (Botafogo, Flamengo, Fluminense and Vasco).

Managerial statistics

Honours
Corinthians
Campeonato Paulista: 1999
Campeonato Brasileiro Série A: 1999
FIFA Club World Championship: 2000

São Paulo
Campeonato Paulista: 2002

Kashima Antlers
J. League Division 1: 2007, 2008, 2009
Emperor's Cup: 2007, 2010
J. League Cup: 2011
Japanese Super Cup: 2009, 2010

Botafogo
Campeonato Carioca: 2013

Urawa Red Diamonds
Emperor's Cup: 2018

Individual
J. League Manager of the Year: 2007, 2008, 2009

References

External links
 
 
 

1950 births
Living people
Brazilian football managers
Brazilian expatriate football managers
Expatriate football managers in Japan
Expatriate football managers in Qatar
Campeonato Brasileiro Série A managers
J1 League managers
Sport Club Corinthians Paulista managers
São Paulo FC managers
CR Vasco da Gama managers
CR Flamengo managers
Cruzeiro Esporte Clube managers
Fluminense FC managers
Santos FC managers
Kashima Antlers managers
Al Ahli SC (Doha) managers
Botafogo de Futebol e Regatas managers
Sociedade Esportiva Palmeiras managers
Sport Club do Recife managers
Clube Atlético Mineiro managers
Urawa Red Diamonds managers
Footballers from Rio de Janeiro (city)